Kenya Women Microfinance Bank, formerly Kenya Women Finance Trust or KWFT, is a deposit-taking microfinance bank in Kenya, the largest economy in the East African Community.

Overview
KWFT is a medium-tier financial services provider in Kenya. , it was the largest deposit-taking microfinance bank in the country, with an asset base valued at about US$220 million (KES:21.75 billion). At that time, the microfinance bank had in excess of 600,000 deposit accounts and a loan book of approximately US$147 million (KSh:14.53 billion), and shareholders' equity valued at US$29.5 million (KShs:2.9 billion).

History
The company was established in 2008, as Kenya Women Finance Trust (KWFT), a 100% subsidiary Kenya Women's Holding (KWH). In 2010, the institution was authorized to accept customer deposits, thereby becoming a deposit-taking microfinance institution. It changed its name to Kenya Women Microfinance Bank and became regulated by the Central Bank of Kenya (CBK). In order to comply with CBK regulations, KWH began to sell shareholding to the KWFT Board, staff, and foreign institutions. In July 2015 it sold 25% equity to 60,974 KWFT members, thereby reducing its own shareholding to the required 25% maximum.

Future plans
In 2016, print media reported that the lender had plans to expand to Rwanda and South Sudan by the third quarter of 2017.

Ownership
The shares of stock of Kenya Women Microfinance Bank are held by Kenyan and foreign institutions and individuals, as depicted in the table below:

Branches
The microfinance bank has branches in rural and urban areas of Kenya.

See also
 List of banks in Kenya
 Microfinance in Kenya

References

External links
 
 Grameen-Credit Agricole: Institutions Supported In Kenya - Kenya Women Microfinance Bank Limited
 Kenya Eases Pain of Loan Defaulters, Alters Credit Bureau Rules

Microfinance companies of Africa
Banks of Kenya
Banks established in 2008
Companies based in Nairobi
Kenyan companies established in 2008
Women in Nairobi